Rolando Mandragora (born 29 June 1997) is an Italian professional footballer who plays as a midfielder for  club Fiorentina.

He began his professional career at Genoa, making five Serie A appearances and playing more frequently on loan at Pescara in Serie B. In 2016 he joined Juventus, where he made a sole appearance and was loaned a year later to Crotone, where he played regularly. He signed for Udinese in 2018. He rejoined Juventus in October 2020 and was immediately loaned back to Udinese.

Mandragora represented Italy at every age group from under-17 to under-21. He made his senior international debut in June 2018.

Club career

Early career
Mandragora is a native of the Naples quartiere of Scampia. His father ran the local football school established by Paolo and Fabio Cannavaro. Mandragora was scouted by Serie A clubs while at Mariano Keller and joined the youth sector of Genoa at age fourteen.

He made his Serie A debut on 29 October 2014 against Juventus in a 1–0 home win. He played the first 69 minutes of the game, before being substituted by Juraj Kucka.

Juventus
On 19 January 2016, Juventus confirmed the signing of Mandragora  on a five-year contract for an initial fee of €6 million, potentially rising to €12 million based on performance.
 He spent the rest of the 2015–16 season on loan at Serie B side Pescara. In April 2016 he suffered a fractured metatarsal in his right foot which required surgery. His recovery was hindered due to complications and he was forced to undergo a second surgery that August.

Mandragora returned to Juventus for the 2016–17 season and was given the number 38 shirt. He made his Juventus debut on 23 April 2017, coming on as a substitute for Claudio Marchisio in the 86th minute of a 4–0 home win against his former club Genoa, in Serie A.

On 5 August 2017, Mandragora was loaned to fellow top-flight team Crotone for the season. He played all but two of their league games, starting each one as the Calabrian club suffered relegation, and contributed two goals; the first of his career was on 24 September to open a 2–0 home win over Benevento.

Udinese
On 2 July 2018, Mandragora was sold to fellow Serie A side Udinese but Juventus kept a buy-back option for €20 million.

Mandragora received a one-match retrospective ban for blasphemy from Lega Serie A in August 2018; after having a shot saved against Sampdoria he shouted insults towards the Virgin Mary and God.

On 22 December 2018, Mandragora scored his first goal for Udinese to open a 1–1 home draw with Frosinone. A week later, he was given a straight red card by the video assistant referee in a 2–0 win over Cagliari also at the Stadio Friuli.

On 23 June 2020, Mandragora sustained an anterior cruciate ligament injury during a 1–0 loss to Torino and was ruled out for over four months.

Return to Juventus
On 3 October 2020, Juventus announced that Mandragora was rejoining the club on a five-year contract for €10.7 million, while remaining with Udinese on loan for the remainder of the 2020–21 season. The deal also included an optional one-year extension of the loan and a potential €6 million extra payment to Udinese based on his performances.

Torino (loan)
On 1 February 2021, after bringing an early finish to his loan at Udinese, Mandragora joined Torino, again on loan, until June 2022. The deal included a conditional obligation to buy.

Fiorentina 
On 4 July 2022, he was sold to Fiorentina.

International career
A regular youth international, Mandragora made his debut for the Italy U21 team on 12 August 2015, in a friendly match against Hungary. He was named in the team for the 2017 FIFA U-20 World Cup in South Korea.

Mandragora made his senior international debut for Italy under Roberto Mancini, starting in a 3–1 friendly loss to France in Nice on 1 June 2018.

He took part in the 2019 UEFA European Under-21 Championship, as the team's captain.

Career statistics

Club

International

Honours
Juventus
Serie A: 2016–17
Coppa Italia: 2016–17
Italy U20
FIFA U-20 World Cup bronze medals: 2017

References

External links

 Profile at the ACF Fiorentina website 
 
 Profile at Lega Serie A
 Profile at FIGC 

1997 births
Living people
Italian footballers
Italy international footballers
Italy under-21 international footballers
Italy youth international footballers
Serie A players
Serie B players
Genoa C.F.C. players
Delfino Pescara 1936 players
Juventus F.C. players
F.C. Crotone players
Udinese Calcio players
Torino F.C. players
ACF Fiorentina players
Footballers from Naples
Association football midfielders